USS Delta may refer to the following ships of the United States Navy:

 , a steam tug for the United States Navy during the American Civil War
 , originally a cargo ship for the United States Navy during World War II; later converted to repair ship as lead ship of the 

United States Navy ship names